"Voyager's Return" is the sixth episode of the first series of Space: 1999, with a screenplay written by Johnny Byrne from an idea by Joe Gannon,  and was first screened on 9 October 1975 in the UK,  and 21 November 1975 in the United States.  The final shooting script is dated 31 July 1974, with filming taking place from 7–21 August.  The episode is based on the Moon encountering a spaceship from Earth, Voyager One, the dangerous power source of which could have fatal consequences.

Plot
A spaceship approaches Alpha signalling that "This is the voice of Voyager One, with greetings from the people of Planet Earth."  This causes consternation in Main Mission, as Voyager One, launched in 1985, is fitted with a propulsion system (the "Queller drive", named after its inventor Ernst Queller) based on the emission of fast neutrons, which can be dangerous to anything too close.  This is made clear when the two Eagles sent to investigate the incoming ship encounter violent vibrations from the drive.  One manages to pull away, but the other disintegrates.

While it is decided that Voyager must be destroyed, Prof. Bergman argues that there must be a better way to save the huge amount of data that the ship has gathered in its travels.  Dr. Ernst Linden, an Alpha scientist working in the Experimental Laboratory overhears that Voyager is returning and approaches Koenig and explains that he is "Ernst Queller" the inventor of the drive, whose identity was changed by Space Command due to issues with a previous disaster. Linden is asked if there are any means of overriding Voyager's security codes to enable instructions to be given to shut down the drive.  While he is attempting to do this, his assistant Jim Haines, whose parents were killed in an accident involving the Queller drive of another Voyager craft, learns that Linden is in fact Ernst Queller, the inventor of the drive.  He assaults Linden, who, despite his injury, manages to shut down Voyager's engines with seconds to spare.

As Alphans explore Voyager, an image of an alien appears - he  introduces himself as Aarchon, the "Chief Justifier of the Worlds of Sidon".  He explains that Sidon is seeking vengeance for the millions on two of their worlds who were killed when the Queller Drive poisoned them.  Three Sidon warships then appear approaching Alpha, intending to destroy it, and Aarchon will not listen to Koenig's protests that Alpha was not responsible for Voyager.  As the ships approach, Queller escapes from sick bay and forces his way into Voyager, taking off and heading towards the Sidon ships.  After pleading for mercy, which is dismissed by Aarchon, Queller gets within range of them, activates the Queller drive, and then destroys the ship and the Sidons including Aarchon.

Backstory
Voyager One was launched in 1985 to investigate far-away regions for signs of intelligent life and habitable solar systems. Its high speed is due to its power plant, the "Queller Drive", an atomic engine that generates fast neutrons which are inimical to many life forms. To quote the episode "(the fast neutrons are) spewed out into space, annihilating everything in their path. You'd survive better standing smack in the middle of a nuclear explosion."  Voyager's sister craft, Voyager Two, proved this when an accident with its Queller Drive destroyed a lunar colony.

Writing
The idea for the story came from a young writer named Joe Gannon, although his idea was far more complicated. Writer Johnny Byrne used only the idea of a space probe from Earth encountering Alpha.  He created the character of Ernst Queller, inspired by "father of the hydrogen bomb" Edward Teller and Wernher von Braun, saying "I saw him like one of these haunted Germans who has done things during the war and felt ashamed of them later and tried to atone in some way." Byrne remarked that he thought the story worked well and reflected "misty-eyed notions about mankind sending universal messages of love, hope and peace," as well as being a metaphor for Western civilisations sending missionaries to third-world countries to "civilise" them.

Reviews
"Voyager's Return" received generally positive reviews  especially mentioning the strong acting, with comments such as, "Basically it's a character piece; Queller has to come to terms with his remorse, his assistant Jim Haines has to come to terms with his hatred and the aliens have come for revenge. Some strong acting complements the strong storyline." Jeremy Kemp's performance as Queller received particular praise, such as "Kemp turns in a magnificent performance as the guilt ridden Queller."

Additional guest cast
 Ernst Queller - Jeremy Kemp
 Jim Haines - Barry Stokes
 Aarchon - Alex Scott

References

External links 
Space: 1999 - "Voyager's Return" - The Catacombs episode guide
Space: 1999 - "Voyager's Return" - Moonbase Alpha's Space: 1999 page

1975 British television episodes
Space: 1999 episodes